Josef Klehr (17 October 1904 – 23 August 1988) was an SS-Oberscharführer (master sergeant), supervisor in several Nazi concentration camps and head of the SS disinfection commando at Auschwitz concentration camp.

Life
Klehr was born as the son of a teacher. After attending the Volksschule in Wohlau until 1918 he got an apprenticeship with a cabinet maker, passing the exam in 1921 that allowed him to do it by trade. As of 1934 he worked as a night porter in a community home, then subsequently as a nurse in a sanatorium. From 1938 he was assistant sergeant at Wohlau prison.

Klehr was a member of the Nazi Party and Allgemeine SS as of 1932. He participated in military exercises with the Wehrmacht and received training to become a medic. Shortly before the beginning of the war he was drafted into the Waffen-SS. In August 1939 he was transferred to Buchenwald concentration camp as a guard, then to Dachau concentration camp as a medical orderly a year later. In January 1941 he was promoted to SS-Unterscharführer and transferred to Auschwitz, working as a medical orderly in the prisoners' infirmary.

Klehr was renowned for killing by phenol injections into the heart, something he essentially took over as of some time in 1942. He devised ways to optimise the speed of the killing process, such as experimenting with the positioning of prisoners before their injection.

Klehr occasionally conducted selections himself, and when he was informed that the camp doctor was unavailable, stated immediately, "Today I am the camp doctor." For example, on 29 August 1942, he and Friedrich Entress selected 746 prisoners to be gassed under the guise of fighting a typhus epidemic. Due to various descriptions of him standing against a background of corpses "wearing either a white coat or "a pink-rubber apron and rubber gloves" and "holding a 20-cc hypodermic with a long needle" in his hands, Klehr has been described as the "ultimate caricature of the omnipotent Auschwitz doctor." He was famed for his sadistic cruelty.

As told by Witold Pilecki, who had first hand knowledge of Klehr's operations in Auschwitz "They were not exclusively those seriously ill or exhausted. Some were here only because Klehr did not like them and put them down in the "needle list", there was no way out. The butchers were also different than in the beginning of the camp; nevertheless I do not know if they may be called degenerates. Klehr used to murder with his needle with great zeal, mad eyes and sadistic smile, he put a stroke on the wall after the killing of each victim. In my times, he brought the list of those killed by him up to the number fourteen thousand and he boasted every day with great delight, like a hunter who told of the trophies of the chase."
 
In 1943 Klehr became head of the disinfection squad (Desinfektionskommando). As a handler of Zyklon B his tasks included not only delousing living quarters and clothes, but direct involvement in the mass gassing of prisoners. He was one of those responsible for inserting the gas. He was present during selections where those incapable of working were sent to the gas chambers, and drew up a schedule as to who under him was to insert the Zyklon B.

On 20 April 1943 Klehr was awarded the War Merit Cross second class with swords. He was transferred to the Gleiwitz subcamp in 1944 where he was head of the prisoners' hospital and was medically responsible for Glewitz camps I to IV.

After the war
Upon the evacuation of Auschwitz, Klehr guarded prisoners being transported to Gross-Rosen concentration camp, after which he was taken under command by an SS combat unit. In early May 1945, he was taken prisoner in Austria by U.S. soldiers. Klehr spent nearly three years in an internment camp. He was released from custody in April 1948. Klehr returned to his family in Braunschweig and resumed work as a cabinet maker. In April 1960 the Frankfurt prosecutor's office issued an arrest warrant which was executed in September after Klehr's whereabouts were determined.

On 19 August 1965, the court convicted him of murder in at least 475 cases, assistance in the joint murder of at least 2730 cases, and sentenced him to life imprisonment with an additional 15 years. A witness, surnamed Głowacki, testified in court that Klehr killed the women who survived the massacre after the alleged uprising at the Budy female subcamp by phenol injection.

While in prison, Klehr was interviewed by journalist and film-maker Ebbo Demant. When Demant brought up Holocaust denial, Klehr said:

On 25 January 1988, Klehr's sentence was suspended due to unfitness for custody (Vollzugsuntauglichkeit). On 10 June, he was ordered to serve the remainder on probation. After seven months of freedom, he died at age 83.

Literature
 Demant, Ebbo (Hg.): Auschwitz — "Direkt von der Rampe weg…" Kaduk, Erber, Klehr: Drei Täter geben zu Protokoll: Hamburg: Rowohlt, 1979; 
 Ernst Klee: Das Personenlexikon zum Dritten Reich: Wer war was vor und nach 1945. Fischer-Taschenbuch-Verlag, Frankfurt am Main 2005; 
 Hermann Langbein: Menschen in Auschwitz. Frankfurt am Main, Berlin Wien, Ullstein-Verlag, 1980; .
 Auschwitz-Birkenau State Museum: Auschwitz in den Augen der SS. Oswiecim 1998; .

References

1904 births
1988 deaths
Holocaust perpetrators in Poland
People from Karkonosze County
People from the Province of Silesia
Nazi Party members
Auschwitz concentration camp medical personnel
Physicians in the Nazi Party
German people convicted of murder
People convicted of murder by Germany
Prisoners sentenced to life imprisonment by Germany
Nazi human subject research
SS non-commissioned officers
Buchenwald concentration camp personnel
Dachau concentration camp personnel
Waffen-SS personnel
German prisoners of war in World War II held by the United States
People convicted in the Frankfurt Auschwitz trials